Silex High School is a high school serving Silex, Missouri and the surrounding area. It serves students from 7th to 12th Grade. It is the only high school in Silex R-1 School District.

Academics
Silex High is ranked 984th among Missouri High Schools. 62% of students are proficient in reading and 42% are proficient in math. Silex has a 90% graduation rate.

References

1912 establishments in Missouri
Educational institutions established in 1912
Public high schools in Missouri
Schools in Lincoln County, Missouri